Faïçal Laraïchi (1961–present) is president of the Moroccan Olympic Committee and president of the Société National de la Radio Télévision (SNRT).

Early life 
He was born Meknès, Morocco.

Laraïchi earned his diploma in engineering from École Spéciale des Travaux Publics in Paris. He earned a Master of Science from Stanford University. 

In 2009, he was the president of the Royal Moroccan Tennis Federation. In June 2017, he was appointed president of the Moroccan Olympic Committee.

He is also the Executive Vice President of the Marrakesh International Film Festival Foundation.

References 

1961 births
Living people
Stanford University alumni
People from Meknes